BMC Medicine is a peer-reviewed electronic-only medical journal published since 2003 by BioMed Central which is part of Springer Nature. It is described as "the flagship medical journal of the BMC series. An open access, open peer-reviewed general medical journal, BMC Medicine publishes outstanding and influential research in all areas of clinical practice, translational medicine, medical and health advances, public health, global health, policy, and general topics of interest to the biomedical and sociomedical professional communities".

Like the other journals in the BMC stable, BMC Medicine is an open access journal, funded by article processing fees.

The journal is abstracted and indexed in CAS, BIOSIS, Embase, MEDLINE, PubMed Central, Science Citation Index Expanded and Scopus. According to the Journal Citation Reports, the journal has a 2020 impact factor of 8.775 and is ranked among the top 10 general medical journals (10 out of 155 journals in the Medicine, General and Internal category.)

References 

BioMed Central academic journals
English-language journals
Publications established in 2003
General medical journals
Creative Commons Attribution-licensed journals
Online-only journals